Satılar can refer to:

 Satılar, Ilgaz
 Satılar, Koçarlı